Dorge is a surname. Notable people with the surname include:

 John Dorge (born 1962), Australian basketball player
 Mitch Dorge (born 1960), Canadian drummer
 Pierre Dørge (born 1946), Danish jazz guitarist

See also
 Dorge Kouemaha (born 1983), Cameroonian soccer player
 Dorle